Apuesta por un Amor (English: Gambling on Love) is a Mexican telenovela produced by Angelli Nesma Medina for Televisa in 2004.

Patricia Manterola and Juan Soler starred as the protagonists, while Alejandra Ávalos, Roberto Ballesteros and Fabián Robles starred as the antagonists.

Univision tlnovelas broadcast Apuesta por un Amor on March 31, 2014.

Plot 
Julia Montaño (Patricia Manterola) is the daughter of Don Julio Montaño (Jorge Vargas), a wealthy landowner in the Yucatán Peninsula. She is a beautiful, strong-willed and sometimes arrogant woman, who flouts her father's will and the customs of their small town by spending her days herding cattle and overseeing the management of her father's ranch. She has two siblings - Álvaro (Fabián Robles), a dissipated young man who spends the majority of his time chasing girls and getting drunk, and Soledad (Lorena Enríquez), a beautiful and ingenuous young girl who falls in love with Gabriel Durán (Juan Soler), the handsome gamester and ex-lover of their greedy step-mother Cassandra (Alejandra Ávalos), who moves to San Gaspar after winning the hacienda of Don Ignacio Andrade (Arsenio Campos), Julio's closest friend, in a poker game. Don Ignacio's son, Francisco (Roberto Palazuelos), has been in love with Julia, but after discovering that he has become involved with the town harlot, Eva (Mónika Sánchez), Julia spurns him for Gabriel.
 
Julia doesn't let herself be domesticated by anyone, but despite all the disagreements, she has to admit she is deeply in love with Gabriel. Nevertheless, after she catches him cheating on her with Eva, Julia declines his marriage proposal. Although she claims to utterly hate him, she eventually accepts to marry him, only to save her family's fortune that Don Julio foolishly lost in a bet with Gabriel. At first their marriage is full of fights and hateful words as Julia is determined to make Gabriel pay for his faults, but her heart softens after giving birth to their son. Things seem to look up for them; and they start living as a normal couple, but the real troubles are yet to come.

Cast

Main

Patricia Manterola as Julia Montaño
Juan Soler as Gabriel Durán
Eric del Castillo as Chepe Estrada
Roberto Palazuelos as Francisco Andrade
Mónika Sánchez as Eva Flores
Jorge Vargas as Julio Montaño
Dacia González as Clara Garcia
Roberto Ballesteros as Justo Hernández
Marco Muñoz as Dr. Sebastian Ibarrola
Alejandra Ávalos as Cassandra Fragoso de Montaño

Also main

Socorro Bonilla as Lázara Jiménez
Tony Bravo as Camilo Beltrán
Gustavo Rojo as Lic. Leonardo de la Rosa
Arsenio Campos as Ignacio Andrade
Maleni Morales as Esther Andrade
Alfonso Iturralde as Prof. Homero Preciado
Roberto D'Amico as Padre Jesús
Jaime Lozano as Braulio Serrano
Justo Martínez as Macario Trujillo
Héctor Sáez as Cayetano Cruz
Fernando Robles as Marcial
Alejandro Rábago as Lorenzo Pedraza
Rafael del Villar as Domingo Ferrer
Fabián Robles as Alvaro Montaño
José María Torre as Luis Pedraza
Francesca Guillén as Matilde Cruz
Julio Mannino as Leandro Pedraza
Lorena Enríquez as Soledad Montaño
Jan as Dr. Felipe Calzada
Juan Ángel Esparza as Samuel Cruz
Benjamín Rivero as Ramón Cabrera
Elsa Navarrete as Lucero Beltrán
Carmen Becerra as Nadia Thomas Fragoso
Manuela Ímaz as Gracia Ferrer

Awards

References

External links 

2004 telenovelas
2004 Mexican television series debuts
2005 Mexican television series endings
Mexican telenovelas
Televisa telenovelas
Mexican television series based on Colombian television series